Papyrus 29 (in the Gregory-Aland numbering), designated by 𝔓29, is an early copy of the New Testament in Greek. It is a papyrus manuscript of the Acts of the Apostles which contains Acts 26:7-8 and 26:20. The manuscript paleographically has been assigned to the early 3rd century.

Description 

The Greek text of this codex is too short to put in a family. Grenfell and Hunt noticed its agreement with Codex Bezae, 1597, and some Old-Latin manuscripts. According to Aland it is a "free text" and it was placed by him in Category I. According to Bruce M. Metzger and David Alan Black the manuscript might be related to the Western text-type, but Philip Comfort stated "the fragment is too small to be certain of its textual character".

It is currently housed at the Bodleian Library, Gr. bibl. g. 4 (P) in Oxford.

See also 
 Acts 26
 List of New Testament papyri

References

Further reading 

 B. P. Grenfell & A. S. Hunt, Oxyrynchus Papyri XIII, (London 1919), pp. 10–12.

External links 
 Oxyrhynchus 1597

New Testament papyri
3rd-century biblical manuscripts
Early Greek manuscripts of the New Testament
Bodleian Library collection
Acts of the Apostles papyri